Mount Tūtoko is the highest peak in Fiordland National Park, in southwest New Zealand. It lies between the Hollyford Valley and Milford Sound, 15 kilometres due north of the Homer Tunnel at the northern end of the Darran Mountains. Two slightly lower summits lie just to the south of the main peak.

The first ascent of Tūtoko was by Samuel Turner and Peter Graham in 1924, climbing by way of the northwest ridge.

The name of the mountain was officially gazetted as Mount Tūtoko on 21 June 2019. The mountain is thought to have been named after Tūtoko, a Māori chief who lived at Martin's Bay, close to the mouth of the Hollyford River.

See also
 List of Ultras of Oceania

References

External links

 "Mount Tutoko" Mountain-Forecast.com
 1966 Encyclopedia of New Zealand page

Mountains of Fiordland
Southern Alps